John Hussey, 1st Baron Hussey of Sleaford (sometimes spelled Hosey, Husey, Hussie, Huse; 1465/1466 – 29 June 1537) was Chief Butler of England from 1521 until his death. He was a member of the House of Lords, and a Chamberlain to King Henry VIII's daughter, Mary I of England.

Early years
Hussey was born in Sleaford, Lincolnshire, England, son of Sir William Hussey, an English judge and Chief Justice of the King's Bench. His mother was the former Elizabeth Berkeley. Hussey's siblings included Sir Robert Hussey (d. 1546), the father of Elizabeth Hussey, the 'Mistress Crane' at whose home at East Molesey the first of the Marprelate tracts, Martin's Epistle, was printed in October 1588; Elizabeth Hussey, who married Richard Grey, 3rd Earl of Kent; and Mary Hussey, who married William Willoughby, 11th Baron Willoughby de Eresby.

In 1497, at the Battle of Blackheath, Hussey was knighted. Six years later, he was made "Knight of the Body", bodyguard to King Henry VII, followed by an appointment as "Master of Lyfield Forest", Rutland in 1505 and Comptroller of the Household in 1509. On 16 August 1513, at Tournai, after the Battle of the Spurs, he and his brother William were promoted to Knights Banneret by Henry VIII.

Career
In 1493 Hussey was appointed Sheriff of Lincolnshire and by 1513 he was custos rotulorum for the county. In June 1520 he travelled to France to take part in the Field of the Cloth of Gold meeting between Henry VIII and Francis I, King of France. On 6 July 1523, he was elected Member of Parliament as a knight of the shire for Lincolnshire. Three years later, on 5 February 1526, he was appointed a judge.

He was created Lord Hussey, of Sleaford, by King Henry VIII in 1529. On 3 November 1529 he was re-elected to Parliament as knight of the shire for Lincolnshire but received a Writs of Summons on 1 December 1529 to the House of Lords as 'Johannes Hussey de sleford, chivaler'. In June 1530, Hussey was named Lincolnshire Castle's Commissioner for Gaol Delivery, and later that same year, Hussey sold some of his large holdings (the Somersetshire manors of Batheaston, Bathampton, Bathford, Twerton; the Wiltshire manors of Compton Bassett, Comerwell, and North Wraxall).

Henry VIII "lodged" at Hussey's Sleaford estate where he held court the next morning before venturing to York to meet with the King of Scotland.

On 10 September 1533, Lord Hussey attended the christening of Elizabeth, daughter of Henry VIII and Anne Boleyn, and carried the canopy over the three-day-old child with George Boleyn, Viscount Rochford, Lord Thomas Howard, and William Howard, 1st Baron Howard of Effingham.

Hussey was Chamberlain to King Henry's daughter, Mary, while Hussey's second wife, Lady Anne, was one of Mary's attendants. Though King Henry forbade anyone from calling his daughter, Mary, by the title of Princess, Lady Anne did do so, after which she lost her attendant position around June 1534 and was imprisoned in the Tower of London in August. Asking for the King's pardon, she was released before the end of the year.

In addition to his responsibilities at Court and Parliament, Hussey was steward to John Longland, the conservative Bishop of Lincoln, and King Henry's confessor.

Downfall

Hussey was implicated along with his cousin Lord Darcy as complicit in the 1536 uprising known as the Pilgrimage of Grace. Though Hussey denied participation in the rebellion, he was accused of conspiring to change laws and depose the king, and that he abetted those who made war on the king in October 1536. The charges may have been levied in part because of Hussey's Catholic sympathies, and because Hussey and his wife, having served 'Princess' Mary, were partisans on her behalf. Hussey was indicted and tried for treason, and found guilty by the House of Lords. He was beheaded in Lincoln on 29 June 1537, while his cousin, Thomas Darcy, was executed on Tower Hill. Hussey's statement ("confession") survives.

Family
John Hussey firstly married Margaret Barr (née Blount), widow of Sir John Barr and daughter of Sir Simon Blount, around 1492 at Keynsham, Gloucestershire, by whom he had issue: 
 Sir William Hussey (c. 1493 – 19 January 1556)
 Thomas Hussey (c. 1495)
 Gilbert Hussey (c. 1499)

John Hussey secondly married Lady Anne Grey in 1509 at Sleaford, Lincolnshire. According to historian Sir William Dugdale, in the documents written by Hussey, shortly before his death in 1537, he speaks of his wife as 'Anne'.  She was the  daughter of George Grey, 2nd Earl of Kent – by his second wife, Catherine Herbert. Lady Anne's paternal grandmother was Lady Katherine Percy, the great-great-granddaughter of King Edward III of England. John Hussey and Lady Anne Grey had issue, including: 
 Sir Giles Hussey (c. 1495/1505) – Knighted by the Earl of Surrey at the Sacking of Morlaix in France in 1522, who married Jane Pigot, and had issue.
 Elizabeth Hussey (c. 1497)
 Reginald Hussey (c. 1501)
 Thomas Hussey
 Joan Hussey, wife of Sir Roger Forster.
 Elizabeth Hussey, second wife of Sir Robert Throckmorton of Coughton, Warwickshire (d. 1586), and had four daughters and two sons.
 Bridget Hussey (c. 1526 – 13 January 1600/1601), married successively: Sir Richard Morrison of Cashiobury, Hertfordshire (d. 17 March 1556); Henry Manners, 2nd Earl of Rutland before 1563; and Francis Russell, 2nd Earl of Bedford on 25 June 1566, as his second wife, and had no issue.
 Anne (or Agnes) Hussey, married to Sir Humphrey Browne, Justice of the Common Pleas, by whom she was the mother of Christian Browne, wife of Sir John Tufton, 1st Baronet.
 Dorothy Hussey, who married three times, thirdly to Thomas Pallister, and had issue.
 Mary Hussey

After his execution, Hussey's home in Sleaford, as well as his other estates, were confiscated by the crown. In 1563, his children were restored in Parliament during the reign of Queen Elizabeth I of England, but Hussey's title was forfeited, and the estates were not returned.

Claim of Hussey Barony
Lord Hussey's brother – Sir Robert Hussey and his son Sir Charles Hussey – adapted to the political requirements of the recently established Church of England; both serving in the office of sheriff. However, the descendants of the anti-Church of England Lord Hussey, whose barony and estates were forfeited, were left in far less secure positions, both regarding their financial and social status; by 1633, the descendants of Lord Hussey's son, Sir Giles Hussey, had left England to freely practice their non-conformist religion in New England.

Lord Hussey's descendants who remained in England included Molineux Disney, a direct descendant of Sir William Hussey, who was the "Son and Heir to the said John Lord Hussey". On 21 March 1680, Molineux Disney made a claim to King Charles II that as, "son and heir, in the direct line to Lord Hussey"  he was entitled to claim the Hussey barony. However, W. B. Turnbull noted in 1836 that "no entry occurs in the Lords' Journal relative to any proceedings upon it". Molineux had apparently withdrawn his application.

Honours
 6 December 1533, John Fewterer, Confessor-General of Syon Abbey, dedicated his book, The myrrour or glasse of Christes passion, to "the Honorable 'Lord Husey', from Syon".

References

External links
Will of Sir William Hussey, PROB 11/10/592, proved 4 July 1496, National Archives 11 December 2013
Will of Dame Elizabeth Hussey, widow, PROB 11/14/415, proved 11 December 1504, National Archives 11 December 2013

1465 births
1537 deaths
People from Sleaford, Lincolnshire
Barons in the Peerage of England
16th-century English judges
People executed under the Tudors for treason against England
Executed people from Lincolnshire
15th-century English people
High Sheriffs of Lincolnshire
Knights Bachelor
John
People executed by Tudor England by decapitation
People executed under Henry VIII
English MPs 1515
English MPs 1523
English MPs 1529–1536
Knights banneret of England
English politicians convicted of crimes